Macroplaza Mall, formerly Pasadena Town Square Mall and Plaza Paseo Mall, is a regional shopping mall in Pasadena, Texas, southeast of Houston. Developed by Federated Department Stores Realty  and attached to an existing Foley's Department store, it opened March 1982 and originally featured Joske's, Foley's, and Palais Royal as its anchor stores. At the time it was built, its location was unusual as it was one of only a few malls in the Houston area not near a highway. Joske's was rebranded as Dillard's in 1987 following the purchase of the Joske's chain. Sears was added as the fourth anchor in 1997 in an effort to increase traffic and allow the mall to be seen as a larger regional mall. There are 3 vacant anchor stores that were once Dillard's, Sears (converted to Sears Hometown), Macy's, and Palais Royal.

A little more than a year after opening, mall developer Federated Department Stores Realty sold the mall, and three others, to mall manager JMB Realty Corporation for $112 millionl. In 2002, the mall was purchased from American General by a local developer. Foley's converted to Macy's in 2006, the same year Dillard's closed. Macy's closed on March 27, 2017.

In 2015 the mall was purchased by Guardian Equity, which planned to remodel the common spaces. In 2016 it was renamed Plaza Paseo Mall.

In mid-2018, its name was again changed to Macroplaza Mall, to allude to it being a gathering place like the plaza of the same name to the south in Monterrey, Mexico, and to emphasize a new focus on the area's Mexican American community.

Palais Royal closed in 2020 when its parent company Stage Stores filed for bankruptcy.

On November 9, 2020, it was announced that Sears would close on January 24, 2021, as part of a plan to close seven Sears stores nationwide, leaving the mall with no anchor stores. It was revealed afterwards the store would be converted and reopened as the smaller-format Sears Hometown store.

Former anchors
 Macy's (Opened as Foley's in 1962, converted to Macy's in 2006, closed in 2017)
 Dillard's (Opened as Joske's in 1982, converted to Dillard's in 1987, closed in 2006)
 Palais Royal (Opened in 1982, closed in 2020)
Sears (Opened in 1997, closed in 2021, reopened shortly afterwards as a Sears Hometown store)

References

External links
 

Pasadena, Texas
Shopping malls in Greater Houston
Shopping malls established in 1982